"Sir Hugh" is a traditional British folk song.

Sir Hugh may also refer to the following people:

Sir Hugh Acland, 5th Baronet, 17th century English MP
Hugh Allan, Canadian financier and shipowner
Hugh Annesley (police officer), Northern Irish police officer
Hugh Arbuthnot (British Army officer), British soldier and politician
Hugh Trenchard, 1st Viscount Trenchard, British airman and soldier